The Episcopal Diocese of Dallas is a diocese of the Episcopal Church (United States) which was formed on December 20, 1895, when the Missionary District of Northern Texas was granted diocesan status at the denomination's General Convention the preceding October. Alexander Charles Garrett, who had served as the first bishop of the Missionary District of Northern Texas, remained as bishop of the new diocese. The diocese began when thirteen parishes were merged.

The Missionary District of Northern Texas was formed when a portion of the Episcopal Diocese of Texas was divided on February 2, 1875. Garrett named the oldest church in the district, which was Saint Matthew's Episcopal Church, as his cathedral church and Dallas as his see. Saint Matthew's has remained the cathedral church of the bishop since that time. Garrett served until his death in 1924.

There are more than seventy parishes and schools in the diocese. The diocese is involved in many national and international missionary outreach programs. The principal offices of the diocese are at the Diocesan House, which is, along with the cathedral church, located on the former site of Saint Mary's Episcopal College for Women. The diocese divided in 1983, the Episcopal Diocese of Fort Worth was formed from the division.

Influence of the Anglican realignment

The dioceses of Dallas along with the Diocese of Western Louisiana are opposed to the ordination of gay clergy but have chosen to stay within the Episcopal Church. The Diocese of Dallas approved, at its 2006 diocesan convention, an amendment to the diocesan constitution that it would break with the Episcopal Church only if that body were no longer part of the worldwide Anglican Communion. A vast majority of the Diocese of Fort Worth, on the other hand, voted to break away from the Episcopal Church in 2008. Additionally, several conservative parishes, including Christ Church, Plano, purchased their properties from the Diocese of Dallas and are now aligned with Anglican bodies other than the Episcopal Church.

Election of George R. Sumner as diocesan bishop

James M. Stanton announced in May 2013 that he would retire as the VI Bishop of Dallas, effective 31 May 2014. Following Stanton's retirement, Paul E. Lambert, elected on 29 March 2008 as bishop suffragan, served as bishop pro-tempore.

On 16 May 2015, the diocese held a "Special Convention for the Election of the VII Bishop of the Episcopal Diocese of Dallas". At this convention, George R. Sumner, then principal of Wycliffe College, Toronto, was duly elected to be VII Episcopal Bishop of Dallas. Sumner was elected with 77 clergy votes out of 138 cast; and 107 lay votes out of 193.  He was consecrated on 14 November 2015.

List of bishops

Missionary and diocesan bishops

Suffragan and assistant bishops

References

Sources

Wiles, C. Preston (2005). "History of the diocese". The Episcopal Diocese of Dallas. Archived from the original on 2008-12-25. Retrieved 2012-07-30.

External links

The Cathedral Church of Saint Matthew, Dallas, Texas
Journal of the Annual Convention, Diocese of Dallas
Province VII

Dallas
Anglican realignment dioceses
Episcopal Church in Texas
Religious organizations established in 1895
Anglican dioceses established in the 19th century
1895 establishments in Texas
Province 7 of the Episcopal Church (United States)